Daniel Kenneth Newman (born January 26, 1952) is a Canadian former professional ice hockey player who played 126 games in the National Hockey League (NHL) for three teams between 1976 and 1980. He had natural offensive talent and was capable of mixing it up when the game turned rough.

Playing career
Newman played two seasons with St. Clair College then split the 1972–73 season between the American Hockey League (AHL) and International Hockey League (IHL). He then played three years with the Port Huron Flags/Wings and scored 39 goals in 1975–76 for the New York Rangers affiliate. Newman played 100 games for the Rangers over two seasons.

Newman was claimed on waivers by the powerhouse Montreal Canadiens and he played 16 games for them in 1978–79. He also dressed for one playoff game, but did not play; consequently his name was left off the Stanley Cup, because he did not qualify. He was traded to the Edmonton Oilers in 1979–80 along with Dave Lumley in exchange for the draft pick the Habs used to take Ric Nattress. Newman retired in 1980 after playing ten games in Edmonton and the rest in the minors. He currently is playing with the Detroit Red Wings Alumni.

Career statistics

Regular season and playoffs

External links
 

1952 births
Living people
Binghamton Dusters players
Canadian ice hockey forwards
Des Moines Capitols players
Edmonton Oilers players
Houston Apollos players
Ice hockey people from Ontario
Montreal Canadiens players
New Haven Nighthawks players
New York Rangers players
Nova Scotia Voyageurs players
Port Huron Flags (IHL) players
Port Huron Wings players
Sportspeople from Windsor, Ontario
Undrafted National Hockey League players
Virginia Wings players